Sophia Campbell née Palmer (1777–1833) was an early Australian settler.

One of eight children, Sophia Palmer was born in Portsmouth and educated in London. She came to Sydney with her naval officer brother John Palmer (1760–1833) and his family, a second unmarried naval officer brother Christopher Palmer (1767–1821), and her unmarried sister Sarah Sophia Palmer (1774–?) on board the Porpoise in November 1800. Her brother John Palmer was bringing his family to settle permanently in New South Wales, and had previously come to Sydney in 1788 as Purser on the Sirius, the flagship of the First Fleet. He had also been Commissary General of New South Wales from 1791 to 1811, remaining employed in the Commissariat until he retired in 1819; and he was a magistrate from 1793.

Sophia first settled on John Palmer's 100 acres (40 ha) 1793 grant which he named Woolloomooloo Farm. Within a year, on 17 September 1801, Sophia married the merchant Robert Campbell, a Scottish Presbyterian eight years her senior, in St Philip's Church, Sydney.

Sophia moved to Wharf House, her husband Robert Campbell’s home behind his wharves on the west side of Circular Quay. Apart from two trips to England (in 1805–06 and 1810–15) and shorter journeys to various parts of New South Wales, she lived in Sydney until her death.

Sophia was until 2009 identified by Professor Joan Kerr, Clifford Burmester and others as an artist who produced two sketchbooks, one held at the National Library of Australia and one held at the State Library of New South Wales. These sketchbooks were re-attributed in May 2009 to Edward Charles Close. This re-attribution removed any evidence that Sophia was an artist.

Sophia died in 1833 and was buried in St John’s Cemetery, Parramatta.

References 

Clifford Amandus Burmester, National Library of Australia. Guide to the Collections, Volume 1. National Library of Australia, Canberra 1974
Joan Kerr, The Dictionary of Australian Artists, Painters, Sketchers, Photographers and Engravers to 1970. Oxford University Press Australia 1992 

Australian painters
1777 births
1833 deaths
Australian women painters